Polygonia gigantea, the giant comma, is a butterfly of the family Nymphalidae. It is found in western and central China.

The wingspan is about 72 mm.

References

Nymphalini
Butterflies described in 1883
Taxa named by John Henry Leech